Song Yadong  (born December 2, 1997) is a Chinese mixed martial artist who competes in the Bantamweight for the Ultimate Fighting Championship (UFC). As of December 6, 2022, he is #8 in the UFC bantamweight rankings.

Background
Raised by a single mother, Song was sent to a Sanda martial arts school at the age of nine. Song eventually began training mixed martial arts at the age of 13, making his professional debut before his sixteenth birthday.

Mixed martial arts career

Ultimate Fighting Championship
In November 2017, it was announced that Song Yadong would step in on short notice, to fight the first ever Indian-born fighter in the UFC and fellow debutante, Baharat Kandare  at UFC Fight Night: Bisping vs. Gastelum in Shanghai, China. Song's UFC debut took place on the 25th November, 2017. Song landed fast counter punches, combinations and some heavy leg kicks, but at the end of the fourth minute, Song landed a right hand that knocked Khandare down, causing Khandare to reach for Song's legs to try and get a takedown; however, it was not a good attempt and Song was easily able to secure a front choke, giving Song his first UFC win and his third win by submission.

In Song's second UFC fight, he faced Brazilian jiu-jitsu practitioner and Muay Thai fighter, Felipe Arantes on June 23, 2018 at UFC Fight Night: Cowboy vs. Edwards in Singapore. After a strong first round, with Song landing quick counter punches and securing top control after catching an Arantes' kick, the second round saw much of the same, except Arantes shot for a double-leg which ultimately resulted in Song easily shucking it off with Arantes, again, landing on his back with Song attempting an arm-triangle choke. However, with exactly a minute left in the second round, Arantes was able to force a stand up and returned to his feet.  With 10 seconds remaining in the round, Arantes was being pushed against the fence and what was looking like another round being won by Song; Song landed a hard elbow, which forced Arantes to crumple onto his knees that forced the referee to jump in and end the fight, declaring Song the victor by way of technical knockout at 4:59 of the second round.  With this win, Song received the Performance of the Night bonus which earned him an extra $50,000

Song was expected to face Frankie Saenz on 24 November 2018 at UFC Fight Night 141. However, it was reported on November 7, 2018 that he pulled out of the event due to injury and he was replaced by newcomer Vince Morales. He won the fight via unanimous decision.

Song was scheduled to face Alejandro Pérez on March 2, 2019 at UFC 235. However, it was reported on January 11, 2019 that he pulled out due to an undisclosed reason. He was replaced by Cody Stamann. The bout with Pérez was rescheduled and eventually took place on July 6, 2019 at UFC 239. Song won the fight via knockout in the first round. This win earned him the Performance of the Night award.

Song faced Cody Stamann on December 7, 2019 at UFC on ESPN 7. After three round fight, the fight ended with a majority draw.

Song faced Marlon Vera in a featherweight bout on May 16, 2020 at UFC on ESPN: Overeem vs. Harris. He won the fight via unanimous decision. Both participants earned the Fight of the Night award.

Song faced Kyler Phillips on March 6, 2021 at UFC 259. He lost the bout via unanimous decision.

Song faced Casey Kenney on August 7, 2021 at UFC 265. He won the fight via split decision.

Song faced Julio Arce on November 13, 2021 at UFC Fight Night 197. He won the fight via technical knockout in round two.

Song faced Marlon Moraes on March 12, 2022 at UFC Fight Night 203. He won the fight via knockout in round one. This win earned him the Performance of the Night award.

Song faced Cory Sandhagen on September 17, 2022 at UFC Fight Night 210.  He lost the fight via technical knockout after doctor stopped the fight.

Song is scheduled to face Ricky Simón on April 22, 2023, at UFC Fight Night 222.

Personal life
Song and his wife have a son.

Championships and accomplishments

Mixed martial arts
Ultimate Fighting Championship
Performance of the Night (Four times) 
Fight of the Night (One time)

Sanda
2011 Hebei Provincial Sanda Championship − 1st place, 60 kg

Muay Thai
2011 National Muay Thai Championship − 5th place

Grappling
2012 Shanghai Jiu-Jitsu Open − 4th place

Mixed martial arts record

|-
|Loss
|align=center|19–7–1 (1)
|Cory Sandhagen
|TKO (doctor stoppage)
|UFC Fight Night: Sandhagen vs. Song 
|
|align=center|4
|align=center|5:00
|Las Vegas, Nevada, United States
|
|-
|Win
|align=center|19–6–1 (1)
|Marlon Moraes
|KO (punches)
|UFC Fight Night: Santos vs. Ankalaev
|
|align=center|1
|align=center|2:06
|Las Vegas, Nevada, United States
|
|-
|Win
|align=center|18–6–1 (1)
|Julio Arce
|TKO (head kick and punches)
|UFC Fight Night: Holloway vs. Rodríguez
|
|align=center|2
|align=center|1:35
|Las Vegas, Nevada, United States
|
|-
|Win
|align=center|17–6–1 (1)
|Casey Kenney
|Decision (split)
|UFC 265 
|
|align=center|3
|align=center|5:00
|Houston, Texas, United States
|
|-
|Loss
|align=center|16–6–1 (1)
|Kyler Phillips
|Decision (unanimous)
|UFC 259
|
|align=center|3
|align=center|5:00
|Las Vegas, Nevada, United States
|
|-
|Win
|align=center| (1)
|Marlon Vera
|Decision (unanimous)
|UFC on ESPN: Overeem vs. Harris
|
|align=center|3
|align=center|5:00
|Jacksonville, Florida, United States
|
|-
|Draw
|align=center|15–5–1 (1)
|Cody Stamann
|Draw (majority)
|UFC on ESPN: Overeem vs. Rozenstruik 
|
|align=center|3
|align=center|5:00
|Washington, D.C., United States
|
|-
|Win
|align=center|15–5 (1)
|Alejandro Pérez
|KO (punch)
|UFC 239
|
|align=center|1
|align=center|2:04
|Las Vegas, Nevada, United States
|
|-
|Win
|align=center|14–5 (1)
|Vince Morales
|Decision (unanimous)
|UFC Fight Night: Blaydes vs. Ngannou 2 
|
|align=center|3
|align=center|5:00
|Beijing, China
|    
|-
|Win
|align=center|13–5 (1)
|Felipe Arantes
|KO (elbow)
|UFC Fight Night: Cowboy vs. Edwards
|
|align=center|2
|align=center|4:59
|Kallang, Singapore
|
|-
|Win
|align=center|12–5 (1)
|Bharat Khandare
|Submission (guillotine choke)
|UFC Fight Night: Bisping vs. Gastelum
|
|align=center|1
|align=center|4:16
|Shanghai, China
|
|-
|Win
|align=center|11–5 (1)
|Makoto Yoshida
|TKO (knees to the body and punches)
|WLF W.A.R.S. 18
|
|align=center|1
|align=center|1:05
|Maerkang, China
|
|-
|Win
|align=center|10–5 (1)
|Edgars Skrivers
|Decision (unanimous)
|Kunlun Fight MMA 10
|
|align=center|3
|align=center|5:00
|Beijing, China
|
|-
|Loss
|align=center|9–5 (1)
|Renat Ondar
|Decision (unanimous)
|WLF World Championship
|
|align=center|5
|align=center|5:00
|Zhengzhou, China
|
|-
|Win
|align=center|9–4 (1)
|Shamil Nasrudinov
|Submission (rear-naked choke)
|WLF W.A.R.S. 10
|
|align=center|2
|align=center|3:19
|Zhengzhou, China
|
|-
|Loss
|align=center|8–4 (1)
|Renat Ondar
|Decision (unanimous)
|WLF E.P.I.C. 9
|
|align=center|3
|align=center|5:00
|Zhengzhou, China
|
|-
|Win
|align=center|8–3 (1)
|Vachagan Nikogosyan 
|TKO (punches)
|WLF E.P.I.C. 6
|
|align=center|1
|align=center|3:12
|Zhengzhou, China
|
|-
|Loss
|align=center|7–3 (1)
|Alexey Polpudnikov
|KO (punch)
|MFP: Mayor's Cup 2016
|
|align=center|2
|align=center|0:50
|Khabarovsk, Russia
|
|-
|Win
|align=center|7–2 (1)
|Artak Nazaryan 
|KO (punch to the body)
|WLF E.P.I.C. 2
|
|align=center|2
|align=center|0:59
|Henan, China
|
|-
|Win
|align=center|6–2 (1)
|Aleksander Zaitsev 
|Decision (unanimous)
|WLF E.P.I.C. 1
|
|align=center|3
|align=center|5:00
|Zhengzhou, China
|
|-
| Loss
|align=center|5–2 (1)
|Giovanni Moljo 
|DQ (groin kicks)
|Road to M-1: China 
|
| align=center| 2
| align=center| 5:00
|Chengdu, China
|
|-
| Win
| align=center| 5–1 (1)
| Rae Yoon Ok
| KO (punch)
| WBK 3
| 
| align=center| 1
| align=center| 1:21
| Ningbo, China
|
|-
| Loss
| align=center| 4–1 (1)
| Xian Ji
| Decision (unanimous)
| ONE FC 24: Dynasty of Champions
| 
| align=center| 3
| align=center| 5:00
| Beijing, China
|
|-
| Win
| align=center| 4–0 (1)
| Yafei Zhao
| Decision (majority)
| RUFF 13
| 
| align=center| 3
| align=center| 5:00
| Shanghai, China
|
|-
| Win
| align=center| 3–0 (1)
| Baasankhuu Damlanpurev
| Submission (rear-naked choke)
| RUFF 12 
| 
| align=center| 1
| align=center| 3:01
| Shanghai, China
|
|-
| Win
| align=center| 2–0 (1)
| Alateng Heili
| Decision (unanimous)
| RUFF 11
| 
| align=center| 3
| align=center| 5:00
| Shanghai, China
| 
|-
| Win
| align=center| 1–0 (1)
| Wulalibieke Baheibieke
| Decision (unanimous)
| RUFF 10
| 
| align=center| 3
| align=center| 5:00
| Shanghai, China
| 
|-
| NC
| align=center| 0–0 (1)
| Wuheng Zhao
| NC (accidental groin strike)
| RUFF 9
| 
| align=center| 1
| align=center| N/A
| Sanya, China
|
|-
|}

See also
 List of current UFC fighters
 List of male mixed martial artists

References

External links
 
 

1997 births
Living people
Sportspeople from Harbin
Sportspeople from Heilongjiang
Bantamweight mixed martial artists
Chinese male mixed martial artists
Chinese practitioners of Brazilian jiu-jitsu
Chinese sanshou practitioners
Chinese Muay Thai practitioners
Ultimate Fighting Championship male fighters
Mixed martial artists utilizing sanshou
Mixed martial artists utilizing Muay Thai
Mixed martial artists utilizing Brazilian jiu-jitsu